Something So Right is an American sitcom television series which ran on two different networks during its time on the air, and in reruns on the USA Network for a number of years after its cancellation.

Something So Right starred Mel Harris as Carly Davis, a twice-divorced party planner who had married Jack Farrell (Jere Burns), a divorced English teacher.  They had three children, one from each of their former marriages.

This program premiered on NBC on September 17, 1996, hammocked between the Top 30 hit Mad About You and the Top 20 hit Frasier; the hammocking effort failed, and the show faltered in the ratings and was canceled the following spring. It was picked up as a midseason replacement on ABC the next year, running until July 7, 1998.

Characters

Carly Davis (Mel Harris) – Carly is a party planner who is currently married to Jack Farrell. She has two biological children from two previous husbands: her son Will Pacino from her first husband Dante and her daughter Sarah from her second husband Sheldon.
Jack Farrell (Jere Burns) – Jack is a teacher and he is currently married to Carly. He has a daughter named Nicole from his ex-wife Stephanie. Jack also has two stepchildren Will and Sarah.
Will Pacino (Billy L. Sullivan) – Will is Carly's son from her first husband Dante. Will lives with his mother, his stepfather, his half sister, and his stepsister. Will started out having a crush on Nicole in the first few episodes but he later fell in love with her friend Cindy and dated a girl named Jenny in one episode.
Nicole Farrell (Marne Patterson) – Nicole is Jack's daughter from his ex-wife Stephanie. She lives with her father, her stepmother, and her two stepsiblings.
Sarah Kramer (Emily Ann Lloyd) – Sarah is Carly's daughter from her second husband Sheldon. She is very wise for her age. She lives with her mother, her stepfather, her half brother, and her stepsister.
Gracie (Carol Ann Susi – NBC series, Traci Lords – ABC series) – Gracie is Carly's assistant.
Dante Pacino (Michael Milhoan) – Dante is Carly's first husband and Will's father. He doesn't seem too intelligent.
Stephanie Farrell (Christine Dunford) – Stephanie is Jack's ex-wife and Nicole's mother. She was an actress who had the starring role on the show Thena Warrior Goddess (A spoof of the show Xena Warrior Princess). She later started dating Sheldon after he divorced his second wife Marianne.
Sheldon Kramer (Barry Jenner) – Sheldon is Carly's second husband and Sarah's father. He is a millionaire. He starts out the series being married to his second wife Marianne but eventually divorces her and then starts dating Stephanie in the second season.
Ben Davis (Bob Barker) – Ben is Carly's widower father. He lives alone and is seen as somewhat of a "ladies man" after his wife's passing.

Episodes
With the exception of the Pilot, every episode title begins with "Something About".

Season 1 (1996–97)

Season 2 (1998)

References
 Brooks, Tim and Marsh, Earle, The Complete Directory to Prime Time Network and Cable TV Shows

External links

American Broadcasting Company original programming
NBC original programming
Television series by Universal Television
1990s American sitcoms
1996 American television series debuts
1998 American television series endings
American television series revived after cancellation
Television series about families
Television shows set in New York City